Claudio Monteverdi  was active as a composer for almost six decades in the late 16th and early seventeenth centuries, essentially the period of period of transition from Renaissance to Baroque music. Much of Monteverdi's music was unpublished and is forever lost; the lists below include lost compositions only when there is performance history or other documentary evidence of the music's one-time existence. 

In the "Voices/instrumentation" column of the chronological list, S= soprano, A= alto, T= tenor, Bar= baritone, B= Bass. The "SV" numbers are as per the Stattkus-Verzeichnis catalogue, first published in 1985 and revised in 2006.

Chronological list of compositions

Sundry undated items
Source:  Stattkus-Verzeichnis  
Ahi che si partì il mio bel sol adorno, SV 290
Confitebor tibi domine a 1, SV 296
Ecce sacrum paratum convivium, SV 299a
Gloria a  8, SV 307
Laudate pueri dominum a 6, SV 311
Prima vedrò ch'in questi prati nascano, SV 322
Salve Regina, SV 327
Taci Armelin, deh taci, SV 334
Venite videte martirem, SV 336
Voglio di vita uscir, SV 337

Details tables

A: Sacrae cantiunculae 1582
Lapidabant Stephanum, SV 207
Veni sponsa Christi, SV 208
Ego sum pastor bonus, SV 209
Surge propera amica mea, SV 210
Ubi duo vel tres congregati fuerint, SV 211
Quam pulchra es et quam decora amica mea, SV 212
Ave Maria gratia plena, SV 213
Domine pater et deus, SV 214
Tu es pastor ovium, SV 215
O magnum pietatis, SV 216
O crux benedicta, SV 217
Hodie Christus natus est, SV 218
O domine Jesu Christe adoro te, SV 219
Pater venit hora clarifica filium tuum, SV 220
In tua patientia possedisti animam tuam, SV 221
Angelus ad pastores ait, SV 222
Salve crux pretiosa, SV 223
Quia vidisti me Thoma credidisti, SV 224
Lauda Syon salvatorem, SV 225
O bone Iesu illumina oculos meos, SV 226
Surgens Iesus dominus noster, SV 227
Qui vult venire post me abneget se, SV 228
Iusti tulerunt spolia impiorum, SV 229
B: Madrigali spirituali 1583
Sacrosancta di Dio veraci imago, SV179
L'aura del ciel sempre fecond spiri, SV 180
Aventurosa notte, in cui risplende, SV 181
D'empi martiri e un mar d'orrori varca, SV 182
Mentre la stell'appar nell'oriente, SV 183
La rose lascia, gli amaranti e gigli, SV 184
L'empio vestia di porpora e di bisso, SV 185
L'uman discorso, quanto poc'importe, SV 186
Dal sacro petto esce veloce dardo, SV 187
Afflito e scalz'ove la sacra sponda, SV 188
De' miei giovenil anni era l'amore, SV 189
C: Canzonette, libro primo 1584
Qual si può dir maggiore, SV 1
Canzonette d'amore che m'uscite del cuore, SV 2
La fiera vista e'l velenoso sguardo, SV 3
Raggi dovè il mio bene non mi date più pene, SV 4
Vita de l'alma mia, SV 5
Il mio martir tengo celat al cuore, SV 6
Son questi i crespi crini e questo il viso, SV 7
Io mi vivea com' Aquila mirando, SV 8
Su ch'el giorno è fore, SV 9
Quando sperai del mio servir mercede, SV 10
Come farò cuor mio quando mi parto, SV 11
Corse a la morte il povero Narciso, SV 12
Tu ridi sempre mai per darmi pene, SV 13
Chi vuol veder d'inverno un dolc' aprile, SV 14
Già mi credev' un sol esser in cielo, SV 15
Godi pur del bel sen felice pulce, SV 16
Giulia quel petto giace un bel giardino, SV 17
Sì come crescon alla terra i fiori, SV 18
Io son Fenice e voi sete la fiamma, SV 19
Chi vuol veder un bosco folto e spesso, SV 20
Hor care canzonette sicuramente andrete, SV 21
D: Madrigali, libro primo (First Book of Madrigals) 1587
Ch'ami la vita mia nel tuo bel nome, SV 23
Se per havervi ohimè donato il core, SV 24
A che tormi il ben mio s'io dico di morire, SV 25
 Amor per tua mercè vattene a quella, SV 26
Baci soavi e cari, cibi della mia vita, SV 27
Se pur non mi consenti ch'io ami te, SV 28
Filli cara e amata dimmi per cortesia, SV 29
Poiché del mio dolore tanto ti nutri amore, SV 30
Fumia la pastorella tessendo ghirlandetta, SV 31
Se nel partir da voi vita mia sento, SV 32
Tra mille fiamme e tra mille catene, SV 33
Usciam Ninfe homai fuor di questi boschi, SV 34
Questa ordì il laccio, questa sì bella man, SV 35
La vaga pastorella s'en va tra fiori, SV 36
Amor sil tuo ferire desse tanto martire, SV 37
Donna sio miro voi ghiaccio divengo, SV 38
Ardo sì ma non t'amo, SV 39
E: Il secondo libro de madrigali (Second Book of Madrigals) 1590
Non si levava ancor l'alba novella, SV 40
Bevea Fillide mia e nel ber dolcemente, SV 41
Dolcissimi legami di parole amorose, SV 42
Non giacinti o narcisi, SV 43
Intorno a due vermiglie e vaghe labra, SV 44
Non sono in queste rive fiori così vermigli, SV 45
Tutte le bocche belle in questo nero volto, SV 46
Donna nel mio ritorno il mio pensiero, SV 47  
Quell' ombra esser vorrei, SV 48
S'andasse Amor a caccia, SV 49
Mentre io miravo fiso de la mia donna, SV 50
Ecco mormorar l'onde e tremolar le fronde, SV 51
Dolcemente dormiva la mia Clori, SV 52
Se tu mi lassi perfida tuo danno, SV 53
La bocca onde l'asprissime parole solean uscir, SV 54
Crudel perchè mi fuggi, SV 55 
Questo specchio ti dono rosa tu dami, SV 56
Non mi è grave il morire, SV 57 
Ti spontò l'ali amor la donna mia, SV 58
Cantai un tempo e se fu dolc' il canto, SV 59
F: Il terzo libro de madrigali (Third Book of Madrigals) 1592
La giovinetta pianta, SV 60
O come è gran martire a celar suo desire, SV 61
Sovra tenere herbette e bianchi fiori, SV 62
O dolce anima mia dunque è pur vero, SV 63
Stracciami pur il core ragion è ben ingrato, SV 64
O rossignuol chin queste verdi fronde, SV 65
Se per estremo ardore morir potesse un core, SV 66
Vattene pur crudel con quella pace, SV 67
O primavera gioventù dell anno, SV 68
Perfidissimo volto ben lusata bellezza, SV 69
Chio non tami cor mio, SV 70
Occhi un tempo mia vita, SV 71
Vivrò fra i miei tormenti e le mie cure, SV 72
Lumi miei, cari lumi, SV 73
Rimanti in pace a la dolente e bella Fillida, SV 74
G: Il primo libro delle canzonette a 3 voci 1594
Io ardo sì, ma'l foco è di tal sorte, SV 309
Occhi miei se mirar più non debb' io, SV 314
Quante son stelle in ciel, SV 324
Se non mi date aita, SV 331 
H: Il quarto libro de madrigali (Fourth Book of Madrigals) 1603
Ah dolente partita, ah fin de la mia vita, SV 75
Cor mio mentre vi miro, SV 76
Cor mio non mori e mori, SV 77
Sfogava con le stelle, SV 78
Volgea l'anima mia soavemente, SV 79
Anima mia perdona a chi tè cruda, SV 80
Luci serene e chiare voi mincendete, SV 81
La piaga cho nel core donna onde lieta sei, SV 82
Voi pur da me partite anima dura, SV 83
A un giro sol de bell occhi lucenti, SV 84
Ohimè se tanto amate di sentir, SV 85
Io mi son giovinetta e rido e canto, SV 86
Quel augellin che canta sì dolcemente, SV 87
Non più guerra pietate occhi miei belli, SV 88
Sì ch'io vorrei morire hora chio bacio amore, SV 89
Anima dolorosa che vivendo, SV 90
Anima del cor mio poi che da me misera me, SV 91
Longe da te cor mio struggomi di dolore, SV 92
Piagn'e sospira e quandi caldi raggi, SV 93
I: Il quinto libro de madrigali (Fifth Book of Madrigals) 1605
Cruda Amarilli che col nome ancora d'amar, SV 94
O Mirtillo anima mia, SV 95
Era l'anima mia già presso a l'ultim' hore, SV 96
Ecco Silvio colei che in odio hai tanto, SV 97
Ch'io t'ami e t'ami più de la mia vita, SV 98
Che dar più vi poss' io, caro mio ben prendete, SV 99
M'è più dolce il penar per Amarilli, SV 100
Ahi come a un vago sol cortese giro, SV 101
Troppo ben può questo tiranno amore, SV 102
Amor se giusto sei fa che la donna mia, SV 103
T'amo mia vita, la mia cara vita, SV 104
E così a poco a poco torno farfalla, SV 105
Questi vaghi concenti che gli augelletti intorno, SV 106
J: Scherzi musicali 1607
I bei legami che stami intorno, SV 230
Amarilli onde m'assale, SV 231
Fugge il verno dei dolori, SV 232
Quando lalba in oriente, SV 233
Non così tosto io miro, SV 234
Damigella tutta bella, SV 235
La pastorella mia spietata e rigida, SV 236
O rosetta, che rosetta, SV 237
Amorosa pupilletta che saetta, SV 238
Vaghi rai di cigli ardenti, SV 239
La violetta chen su lherbetta, SV 240
Giovinetta ritrosetta, SV 241
Dolci miei sospiri, SV 242
Clori amorosa damor rubella, SV 243
Lidia spina del mio core, SV 244
Balletto: De la bellezza le dovute lodi, SV 245
K: Sanctissimae Virgini missa senis vocibus... incl. Vespers of 1610 
Missa a 6 voci da capella "In illo tempore", SV 205
Vespro della Beata Vergine:  
Domine ad adiuvandum SV 206:1
Dixit Dominus SV 206:2
Nigra sum SV 206:3
Laudate pueri Dominum SV 206:4
Pulchra es SV 206:5
Laetatus sum SV 206:6
Duo seraphim SV 206:7
Nisi Dominus SV 206:8
Audi coelum verba mea SV 206:9
Lauda Jerusalem SV 206:10
Sonata sopra "Sancta Maria, ora pro nobis" SV 206:11
Ave maris stella SV 206:12
Magnificat (7 voices) SV 206:13
Magnificat (6 voices) SV 206a:12
L: Il sesto libro de madrigali (Sixth Book of Madrigals) 1614
Lamento d'Arianna a  5, SV 107
Zefiro torna el bel tempo rimena, SV 108
Una donna fra laltre honesta e bella, SV 109
A dio Florida bella il cor piagato, SV 110
Lagrime d'amante al sepolcro dell amata, SV 111
Ohimè il bel viso, ohimè il soave sguardo, SV 112
Qui rise o Tirsi e qui ver me rivolse, SV 113
Misero Alceo dal caro albergo fore, SV 114/114a
Batto qui pianse Ergasto, ecco la riva, SV 115
Presso un fiume tranquillo disse a Filena, SV 116/116a
M: Concerto: settimo libro de madrigali (Seventh Book of Madrigals) 1619
Tempro la cetra e per cantar gli honori di Marte, SV 117
Non è di gentil core chi non arde d'amore, SV 118
A quest olmo, a quest ombre et a quest onde, SV 119
O come sei gentile caro augellino, SV 120
Io son pur vezzosetta pastorella, SV 121
O viva fiamma, o miei sospiri ardenti, SV 122
Vorrei baciarti o Filli, SV 123
Dice la mia bellissima Licori, SV 124
Ah che non si conviene romper la fede, SV 125
Non vedrò mai le stelle, SV 126
Ecco vicine, o bella tigre, SV 127
Perchè fuggi tra salci, ritrosetta ma bella, SV 128
Tornate o cari baci a ritornarmi in vita, SV 129
Soave libertate già per si lunga etate, SV 130
S'el vostro cor madonna altrui pietoso tanto, SV 131
Interrotte speranze, eterna fede, SV 132
Augellin che la voce al canto spieghi, SV 133
Vaga su spina ascosa e rosa ruggiadosa, SV 134
Eccomi pronta ai baci, SV 135
Parlo misero o taccio, SV 136
Tu dormi, ah crudo core, SV 137
Al lume delle stelle Tirsi sotto un alloro, SV 138
Con che soavità labbra odorate, SV 139
Ohimè dovè il mio ben, dov'è il mio core, SV 140
Se i languidi miei sguardi, SV 141
Se pur destina e vole, SV 142
Chiome doro, bel tesoro, SV 143
Amor che deggio far se non mi giova amar, SV 144
Tirsi e Clori, SV 145
N: 4 motets in Libro primo de motetti in lode d'Iddio nostro Signore... 1620
Cantate domino canticum novum a 6, SV 293
Christe adoramus te, SV 294
Domine ne in furore tuo, SV 298
Adoramus te Christe, SV 289
O: Scherzi musicali cioè arie... 1632
Maledetto sia laspetto, SV 246
Quel sguardo sdegnosetto, SV 247
Era già tutta mia, SV 248
Ecco di dolci raggi il sol armato, SV 249
Ecco di dolci raggi il sol armato, SV 249a
Et è pur dunque verò, SV 250
Zefiro torna e di soavi accenti, SV 251
P: Madrigali guerriri, et amorosi...Libro ottavo (Eighth Book of Madrigals) 1638
Canti guerrieri: 
Altri canti d'Amor, SV 146
Hor che'l ciel e la terra e'l vento tace, SV 147
Gira il nemico insidioso amore, SV 148
Se vittorie sì belle, SV 149
Armato il cor dadamantina fede, SV 150
Ogni amante è guerrier, SV 151
Ardo avvampo mi struggo, ardo accorete amici, SV 152
Combattimento di Tancredi e Clorinda, SV 153
Ballo: Movete al mio bel suon le piante snelle, SV 154
Canti amorosi:
Altri canti di Marte e di sua schiera, SV 155
Vago augelletto che cantando vai, SV 156
Mentre vaga Angioletta, SV 157
Ardo e scoprir ahi lasso, SV 158
O sia tranquillo il mare, SV 159
Ninfa che scalza il piede, SV 160
Dolcissimo uscignolo, SV 161
Chi vol haver felice e lieto il core, SV 162
Lamento della Ninfa, SV 163
Perchè ten fuggi o Fillide, SV 164
Non partir ritrosetta troppo lieve e incostante, SV 165
Su pastorelli vezzosi, SV 166
Ballo delle ingrate, SV 167
Q: Selva morale e spirituale 1641
O ciechi il tanto affaticar che giova, SV 252
Voi chascoltate in rime sparse il suono, SV 253
E questa vita un lampo, SV 254
Spuntava il dì quando la rosa sovra, SV 255
Chi vol minnamori, SV 256
Messa a 4 da capella, SV 257
Messa a 4 da capella, SV 257a
Gloria, SV 258
Crucifixus, SV 259
Et resurrexit, SV 260
Et iterum venturus est, SV 261
Ab aeterno ordinata sum, SV 262
Dixit dominus I, a 8 in g, SV 263
Dixit dominus II, a 8 in d, SV 264
Confitebor tibi domine I, a  8, SV 265
Confitebor tibi domine II, a  3, SV 266
Confitebor tibi domine III, a  5, SV 267
Confitebor tibi domine IIIa, a  1, SV 267a
Beatus vir I, a  6, SV 268
Beatus vir II, a  5, SV 269
Laudate pueri dominum I, a  5, SV 270
Laudate pueri dominum II, a  5, SV 271
Laudate dominum omnes gentes I, a  8, SV 272
Laudate dominum omnes gentes Ia, a  5, SV 272a
Laudate dominum omnes gentes II, SV 273
Laudate dominum omnes gentes III, SV 274
Credidi propter quod locutus sum, SV 275
Memento domine David, SV 276
Sanctorum meritis I, SV 277
Sanctorum meritis II, SV 278
Deus tuorum militum I, a  1, SV 278a
Iste confessor I, a  1, SV 278b
Iste confessor II, a  2, SV 279
Ut queant laxis, SV 279a
Deus tuorum militum II, a  3, SV 280
Magnificat I, a  6, SV 281
Magnificat II, a  4, SV 282
Salve Regina I, SV 283
Salve Regina II, SV 284
Salve Regina III, SV 285
Jubilet tota civitas, SV 286
Laudate dominum in sanctis eius, SV 287
Pianto della Madonna, SV 288
R: Messa et salmi 1650
Messa a 4 voci da capella, SV 190
Dixit dominus I, a  8, SV 191
Dixit dominus II, a  8, SV 192
Confitebor tibi domine I, a  1, SV 193
Confitebor tibi domine II, a  2, SV 194
Laudate pueri dominum, SV 196
Laudate dominum omnes gentes, SV 197
Laudate dominum omnes gentes, SV 197a
Laetatus sum I, a  6, SV 198
Laetatus sum II, a  5, SV 199
Nisi dominus I, a  3, SV 200
Nisi dominus II, a  6, SV 201
Lauda Jerusalem dominum I, a  3, SV 202
Lauda Jerusalem dominum II, a  5, SV 203
Letanie della Beata Vergine, SV 204
S: Madrigali e canzonette...Libro nono: (Ninth Book of Madrigals) 1651
Se vittorie si belle SV 149
Armato il cor d'adamantina, SV 150
Ardo e scoprir, ahi Iasso, SV 158
O sia tranquillo il mare, SV 159
Bel pastor del cui bel guardo, SV 168
Alcun non mi consigli, SV 169
Di far sempre gioire, SV 170
Quando dentro al tuo seno, SV 171
Non voglio amare, SV 172
Come dolce hoggi lauretta spira, SV 173
Alle danze, alle gioie, ai diletti, SV 174
Perchè se modiavi, SV 175
Sì chio vamo, occhi vaghi, occhi belli, SV 176
Su pastorelli vezzosi, SV 177
O mio bene, o mia vita, SV 178
Zefiro torna e di soavi accenti, SV 251

See also
List of operas by Claudio Monteverdi

References

Citations

Sources
Carter, Tim (2002): Monteverdi's Magic Theatre. Yale University Press, New Haven and London. 
Redlich, H.F. (1952): Claudio Monteverdi: Life and Works. Oxford University Press, London. 
Stattkus, Manfred H. (1985–2006): Claudio Monteverdi: Verzeichnis der erhaltenen Werke. Stattkus-Musik, Bergkamen, Germany. Retrieved 18 July 2017. (in German)
Whenham, John (2007): "The works of Monteverdi: catalogue and index" in Whenham, John and Wistreich, Richard: The Cambridge Companion to Monteverdi. Cambridge University Press, Cambridge.  (pages 314–38)

 
Monteverdi